Alan McKenzie Livingstone (2 September 1907 – 1970) was a Scottish professional footballer who played in the Football League for Clapton Orient, Hartlepools United, Hull City, Mansfield Town, Merthyr Town, New Brighton and Walsall.

References

1970 deaths
Scottish footballers
Association football forwards
English Football League players
Everton F.C. players
Dumbarton Harp F.C. players
Hull City A.F.C. players
Scunthorpe United F.C. players
Hartlepool United F.C. players
Crewe Alexandra F.C. players
New Brighton A.F.C. players
Leyton Orient F.C. players
Merthyr Town F.C. players
Swansea City A.F.C. players
Ayr United F.C. players
Chelsea F.C. players
Armadale F.C. players
East Fife F.C. players
Walsall F.C. players
Oswestry Town F.C. players
Colwyn Bay F.C. players
Chester F.C. players
Dumbarton F.C. players
Mansfield Town F.C. players
Stockport County F.C. players